Hamilton was an electoral district of the Legislative Assembly in the Australian state of Queensland from 1932 to 1950.

The district was based in the inner northeastern suburbs of Brisbane, and included the suburbs of Albion, Ascot, Eagle Farm, Hamilton and Hendra. It was a safe seat for the non-Labor parties in the Assembly throughout its existence. This district became part of the electoral district of Clayfield when it was created in 1950.

Members for Hamilton

Election results

See also
 Electoral districts of Queensland
 Members of the Queensland Legislative Assembly by year
 :Category:Members of the Queensland Legislative Assembly by name

References

Former electoral districts of Queensland
Hamilton, Queensland
Constituencies established in 1932
Constituencies disestablished in 1950
1932 establishments in Australia
1950 establishments in Australia